The 2002 South Carolina gubernatorial election was held on November 5, 2002 to select the governor of the state of South Carolina. Mark Sanford, the Republican nominee, defeated incumbent Democratic Governor Jim Hodges to become the 115th governor of South Carolina. Hodges became only the third incumbent governor and the first Democratic governor in South Carolina history to lose reelection.

Democratic primary
Governor Jim Hodges faced no opposition from South Carolina Democrats and avoided a primary election.

Republican primary
The South Carolina Republican Party held their primary on June 11, 2002 and the runoff on June 25, 2002. The contest became a race between Lieutenant Governor Bob Peeler from the Upstate and Mark Sanford, a former representative of the 1st congressional district in the Lowcountry. Sanford received the support of the candidates eliminated from the runoff election and easily defeated Peeler.

General election

Predictions

Polling

The general election was held on November 5, 2002 and Mark Sanford was elected as the next governor of South Carolina. Turnout was higher than the previous gubernatorial election because of the competitive nature of the race between the two parties.

 
 

|-
| 
| colspan=5 |Republican gain from Democratic
|-

See also
Governor of South Carolina
List of governors of South Carolina
South Carolina gubernatorial elections

Notes

References

External links
SCIway Biography of Governor James Hovis Hodges
South Carolina election returns

2002 United States gubernatorial elections
2002
2002 South Carolina elections